Nigel Walker may refer to:

Nigel Walker (athlete) (born 1963), Welsh runner and rugby union player
Nigel Walker (criminologist) (1917–2014), English criminologist
Nigel Walker (footballer) (1959–2014), English footballer